McCaskill is a town in Hempstead County, Arkansas, United States. The population was 96 at the 2010 census. It is part of the Hope Micropolitan Statistical Area.

Geography

Demographics

As of the census of 2000, there were 84 people, 28 households, and 22 families residing in the city. The racial makeup of the city was 73.81% White, 15.48% Black or African American, 2.38% Native American, 7.14% from other races, and 1.19% from two or more races. 15.48% of the population were Hispanic or Latino of any race.

There were 28 households, out of which 42.9% had children under the age of 18 living with them, 53.6% were married couples living together, 17.9% had a female householder with no husband present, and 21.4% were non-families. 17.9% of all households were made up of individuals, and 7.1% had someone living alone who was 65 years of age or older. The average household size was 3.00 and the average family size was 3.32.

In the city the population was spread out, with 36.9% under the age of 18, 4.8% from 18 to 24, 26.2% from 25 to 44, 20.2% from 45 to 64, and 11.9% who were 65 years of age or older. The median age was 30 years. For every 100 females, there were 90.9 males. For every 100 females age 18 and over, there were 103.8 males.

The median income for a household in the city was $25,000, and the median income for a family was $26,250. Males had a median income of $30,313 versus $16,875 for females. The per capita income for the city was $8,826. There were 33.3% of families and 37.5% of the population living below the poverty line, including 52.5% of under eighteens and 100.0% of those over 64.

References

Towns in Arkansas
Towns in Hempstead County, Arkansas
Hope micropolitan area